SS Armadale Castle was a passenger steamship built in 1903 at Fairfield Shipbuilding and Engineering, Govan, Scotland, for the Union-Castle Mail Steamship Co Ltd, London, the first ship ordered for the newly formed company.

Armadale Castle was requisitioned as an armed merchant cruiser in the Royal Navy 2 August 1914.  She was returned to commercial service in 1919.  She was laid up at Netley in 1935, reprieved for one voyage, then scrapped in 1936 at Blyth by Hughes Bolckow Ltd.

See also 
 Ships built at Govan

References

External links 
 Shipping Times: Clydebuilt Database
  Transcribed logbooks August 1914 to April 1918

Ships built on the River Clyde
Steamships of the United Kingdom
Ships built in Govan
Ships of the Union-Castle Line
1903 ships